Henry Duarte Molina  (born 5 October 1958) is a Costa Rican football coach.

Managerial career
Duarte has coaches several Costa Rican Primera División clubs, with him taking charge of Herediano, one of the country's Big Four, in 1997 as one of his major jobs.

Duarte was named manager of Nicaragua in December 2014.

Managerial statistics

References

External links
 http://www.nacion.com/deportes/futbol-internacional/Tecnico-costarricense-Henry-Duarte-Nicaragua_0_1460054066.html
 http://wvw.nacion.com/ln_ee/2009/diciembre/14/deportes2193266.html

1958 births
Living people
People from Guanacaste Province
Costa Rican football managers
Puntarenas F.C. managers
C.S. Herediano managers
Nicaragua national football team managers
2017 CONCACAF Gold Cup managers
2019 CONCACAF Gold Cup managers